Aluminium oxides or aluminum oxides are a group of inorganic compounds with formulas including aluminium (Al) and oxygen (O).

Aluminium(I) oxide
Aluminium(II) oxide (aluminium monoxide)
Aluminium(III) oxide (aluminium oxide),, the most common form of aluminium oxide, occurring on the surface of aluminium and also in crystalline form as corundum, sapphire, and ruby.